Siple Island, an island in Wrigley Gulf.  
 Mount Siple, a volcano in Siple Island.
 Paul Siple, an American Antarctic explorer.
 Siple Coast, a coast in Ross Ice Shelf.
 Siple Station, an Antarctic station, established in 1973.
 Siple Ridge, a high ridge, in the Quartermain Mountains, Victoria Land.
 Siple Dome, an ice dome east of Siple Coast in Antarctica.
 Siple-Passel equation, a way to calculate Wind chill factor